Ein Fall für TKKG is a title shared by two German television series. An adaptation of the TKKG franchise. 12 live-action episodes ran from 1985-1985. 26 cartoon episodes were released in 2014.

Plot 
The individual episodes of the series are based - with some exceptions - on the books for young people by Stefan Wolf. Again and again, the four teenagers get involved in mysterious cases, which they masterfully solve or uncover. The four attend a boarding school. Tim and Dumpling also live there, while Gaby and Karl are "externs" (they live with their parents and only come to the boarding school for school lessons). Occasionally, there are events at their school that force TKKG to intervene. 

Inspector Glockner, who is also Gaby's father, can always count on the help of the young detectives. Most of the time, Tim, as the leader of the group, is responsible for the approach to the different cases. He is essentially supported in this by the highly intelligent Karl. At the end of each episode, as a running gag so to speak, Dumpling always claims the success of an action for himself.

See also
List of German television series

References

External links
 

1985 German television series debuts
1987 German television series endings
Flash cartoons
German children's television series
Television shows based on children's books
German-language television shows
ZDF original programming